Calyptra lata is a moth of the  family Erebidae. It has been found in Japan and far-east Russia.

References

Calpinae
Moths of Japan
Moths described in 1881